Julie Nicholson is an author and the mother of the late Jenny Nicholson, who was killed at the age of 24, when suicide bomber Mohammad Sidique Khan detonated a bomb in the London Underground in the 7 July 2005 London bombings.

Jenny Nicholson 
Jenny Nicholson was a 24 year old musician who was killed on her journey from Reading into central London, on her way to work. She was killed in a suicide attack by Mohammad Sidique Khan on the eastbound Circle line at Edgware Road station after her train was diverted from the usual route due to a mechanical problem. A few minutes prior to the explosion, Jenny had phoned her boyfriend, James White.

Response 
Julie Nicholson was on holiday in Wales when she and her husband, Greg, learnt Jenny had died. After going on extended compassionate leave, Julie decided to step down as priest from the parish of St Aidan with St George, in Bristol, eight months after Jenny's death, since she could not forgive the attacker. While announcing her intention to resign as vicar, Julie described how “It's very difficult to stand behind an altar and lead people in words of peace and reconciliation and forgiveness when I feel very far from that myself.” Julie continued to work in Bristol with a community youth group.

While mourning Jenny's death, Julie began to write down her thoughts. These were later turned into a book: A Song for Jenny. A film of the same name was released on 5 July 2015, as an adaptation of the book. It was released almost exactly 10 years after Jenny's death.

References

1953 births
Living people
British Anglicans
July 2005 London bombings
British women non-fiction writers
Church of England priests
21st-century British non-fiction writers
21st-century British women writers